Ben Holmes (born October 15, 1994) is an American professional football quarterback for the Toronto Argonauts of the Canadian Football League (CFL). He played college football at Nassau Community College and Tarleton State.

High school career
Holmes attended Orchard Park High School, where he initially played wide receiver and won the state title in 2011. He then switched to quarterback and took the Quakers back to the state final. Holmes attended prep school in Texas.

College career
Holmes first enrolled at Nassau Community College. He then transferred and played for the Tarleton State Texans where he led the team to a 23-2 record in two seasons in Division II. As a senior, Holmes threw for 34 touchdowns and three interceptions. He made 196 completions for 3,338 yards and rushed for 59 yards on 32 attempts with a touchdown.

Professional career
Holmes played for the Arizona Rattlers in the Indoor Football League and for the Sea Lions in the Spring League. He was drafted fourth overall in the 2022 USFL Draft by the New Jersey Generals, but was released on April 1, 2022 due to a toe injury and replaced by Luis Perez.

References

External links
Tarleton State Texans bio

1995 births
Living people
American football quarterbacks
Arizona Rattlers players
Tarleton State Texans football players
People from Orchard Park, New York
The Spring League players
New Jersey Generals (2022) players
Edmonton Elks players
Toronto Argonauts players